Kleberg County Airport  is a county-owned, public-use airport located nine nautical miles (10 miles; 17 km) west of the central business district of Kingsville, a city in Kleberg County, Texas, United States. This airport is included in the FAA's National Plan of Integrated Airport Systems for 2011–2015, which categorized it as a general aviation facility.

Although many U.S. airports use the same three-letter location identifier for the FAA and IATA, this facility is assigned IKG by the FAA but has no designation from the IATA.

Facilities and aircraft 
It has one runway designated 13/31 with an asphalt surface measuring 6,000 by 75 feet (1,829 x 23 m).

For the 12-month period ending March 20, 2011, the airport had 7,400 aircraft operations, an average of 20 per day: 81% general aviation, 18% military, and 1% air taxi. At that time there were 11 aircraft based at this airport: 73% single-engine, 9% jet and 18% helicopter.

References

External links 
 Kleberg County Airport
 Aerial photo as of 14 January 1995 from USGS The National Map
 
 

Airports in Texas
Buildings and structures in Kleberg County, Texas
Transportation in Kleberg County, Texas
Kingsville, Texas